Kitanzini is an administrative ward in the Iringa Urban district of the Iringa Region of Tanzania. In 2016 the Tanzania National Bureau of Statistics report there were 3,785 people in the ward, from 3,617 in 2012.

Neighborhoods 
The ward has 9 neighborhoods.

 Jamat
 Kitanzini
 Legezamwendo
 Madrasa
 Maweni
 Miyomboni
 Mlimani
 Polisi Line
 Stendi Kuu

References 

Wards of Iringa Region
Constituencies of Tanzania